The Malbork Voivodeship (Polish: Województwo malborskie), after Partitions of Poland also referred to as the Malbork Land (Polish: Ziemia malborska), was a unit of administrative division and local government in the Kingdom of Poland from 1454/1466 until the partitions in 1772–1795. Together with the Pomeranian and Chełmno Voivodeships and the Prince-Bishopric of Warmia it formed the historical province of Royal Prussia. Its capital was at Marienburg (Malbork).

History

After the Teutonic Knights during the 13th century had conquered the Prussian territories and incorporated them into the Order's State, the castle of Marienburg served as the seat of the Grand Masters. Following the 1410 Battle of Grunwald, the Knights once again could withstand the Polish Siege of Marienburg. However, after the uprising of the Prussian Confederation in 1454 (in which Marienburg did not participate) and the outbreak of the Thirteen Years' War with the Kingdom of Poland, they had to withdraw to Königsberg and after their final defeat lost the castle and the surrounding territory in the 1466 Second Peace of Thorn.

King Casimir IV Jagiellon of Poland annexed the territory and established the voivodeship of Marienburg, including the towns of Elbing (Elbląg), Stuhm (Sztum) and Christburg (Kiszpork, later Dzierzgoń). Since the 1569 Union of Lublin the Lands of the Polish Crown were part of the larger Polish–Lithuanian Commonwealth. Marienburg Castle was occupied twice by troops of the Swedish Empire: during the Thirty Years' War 1626–1629 and again from 1656 to 1660 during the Second Northern War. In 1772 the voivodeship was annexed by Prussia in the First Partition of Poland and became part of the newly established Province of West Prussia the next year.

Zygmunt Gloger in his monumental book Historical Geography of the Lands of Old Poland provides this description of Malbork Voivodeship:

"The smallest of three voivodeships of Polish Prussia, it was divided into four counties: Sztum, Kiszpork, Elblag and Malbork. Local starostas resided at Kiszpork, Sztum, Tolkmicko, and other locations. Sejmiks and courts were not located at Malbork, but at Sztum, which itself was governed by the starosta of Kiszpork. At sejmiks, local nobility elected eight deputies to the Prussian Sejm, e.g. two from each county (...) Malbork Voivodeship’s coat of arms was almost identical as Chelmno Voivodeship's, with differences in color of the eagle. The Prussian Sejm took place alternatively at Malbork and Grudziadz".

Administration
Voivodeship Governor (Wojewoda) seat: 
 Malbork

Voivodes list: 
 Ścibor Bażyński/Stibor (Tiburcius) von Baysen 15 June 1467 – 1480
 Mikołaj Bażyński/Niklas von Baysen 23 February 1481 – 27 March 1501
 Maciej Raba 21 August 1512 – 1546
 Achacy Czema 1546 – 24 May 1564
 Fabian Czema 1566–1580
 Fabian Czema (younger) 1581-22 August 1605
 Jerzy Kostka 1605–1611
 Stanisław Działyński 1611–1615
 Jan Wejher 1615–1618
 Stanisław Konarski 1618–1625
 Samuel Żaliński 3 November 1625 – 6 October 1629
 Samuel Konarski 30 November 1629 – 1641
 Mikołaj Wejher 11 October 1641 – 20 May 1643
 Jakub Wejher 20 May 1643 – 21 February 1657
 Stanisław Działyński 30 March 1657 – 1677
 Jan Ignacy Bąkowski 1677–1679
 Jan Gniński 1679
 Franciszek Jan Bieliński 1681–1685
 Ernest Denhoff 1685–1693
 Władysław Łoś 1694
 Jan Jerzy Przebendowski 17 September 1697 – 9 February 1703
 Piotr Kczewski 9 February 1703 – 20 November 1722
 Piotr Przebendowski 21 November 1722 – 1755
 Jakub Działyński 27 May 1756 – 17 September 1772

Regional council (sejmik generalny):
 Stuhm

The Voivodeship was divided into four powiats (counties or administrative divisions):
 Sztum County, (Powiat Sztumski), 
 Kiszpork County, (Powiat Kiszporski), 
 Elbląg County, (Powiat Elbląski), 
 Malbork County, (Powiat Malborski).

Sources 
 Malbork Voivodeship, description by Zygmunt Gloger

External links
 Map showing borders of Malbork Voivodeship in 1752

Voivodeships of the Polish–Lithuanian Commonwealth
Royal Prussia
1466 establishments in Europe
15th-century establishments in Poland
1772 disestablishments in the Polish–Lithuanian Commonwealth